Ama Lai Shraddhanjali (Nepali: आमालाई श्रद्धाञ्जली. English translation: Tribute to Mother) is a Nepali folk music album by Navneet Aditya Waiba and Satya Waiba, released on 3 November 2017 in Patan Museum, Kathmandu, Nepal. It was released by OKListen. The album is a tribute to Legendary Nepali folk singer the late Hira Devi Waiba, Navneet and Satya's mother.

The music arrangement for the album was done by Rubin Kumar Shesthra of Kutumba.

Background 
After Hira Devi Waiba's death in 2011, the brother and sister duo tasked themselves to re-arranging and recording her songs and in 2015 they handpicked seven of her most iconic and popular songs for this album. The recording process took two years to complete.

Track listing

See also 
 Navneet Aditya Waiba
Music of Nepal

References

External links 
क्याथे प्यासिफिक एअरवेजको जागिर छाडी 
आमाको गीत गाएर नवनीतले नचाइन् कालेबुङलाई  
TV Interview, Janata TV
TV Interview, News 24 
TV Interview, ABN

2017 albums
Navneet Aditya Waiba albums